Mills Creek is a short eastward-flowing stream whose watershed originates in and around Mills Canyon Park in Burlingame's foothills in San Mateo County, California, United States. The creek runs south of Millbrae Creek and north of Easton Creek watercourses respectively. 

The creek is in a mostly natural channel through the hills and residential flatlands of Burlingame. Starting near the Caltrain tracks, it is partially culverted and channelized into the San Francisco Bay.

Watercourse gallery

See also
List of watercourses in the San Francisco Bay Area

References

External links
 USGS map of creek
 Google map of the creek

Rivers of San Mateo County, California
Rivers of Northern California
Tributaries of San Francisco Bay